In the geologic timescale, the Přídolí Epoch is the uppermost subdivision of the Silurian Period, dated at between 423 ± 2.3 and 419.2 ± 3.2 mya (million years ago). The Přídolí Epoch succeeds the Ludfordian Stage and precedes the Lochkovian, the lowest of three stages within the Lower Devonian geological epoch. It is named after one locality at the Homolka a Přídolí nature reserve near the Prague suburb, Slivenec, in the Czech Republic. The GSSP is located within the Požáry Formation, overlying the Kopanina Formation. Přídolí is the old name of a cadastral field area.

The Šilalė Event, a negative carbon isotope excursion corresponding to an extinction event of conodonts, occurred during the early Pridoli.

References 

 
Silurian geochronology
Geological epochs